Déjà-vu is the third original album by Japanese singer Hitomi. Originally released on November 12, 1997, by avex trax, it reached #2 on the Oricon Top 200 and charted for 11 weeks.

Track listing

References

External links
Official hitomi Site
Official hitomi discography
Oricon archive of Déjà-vu

Hitomi albums
1997 albums
Avex Trax albums
Dance-pop albums by Japanese artists
Albums produced by Tetsuya Komuro